Critters 2: The Main Course (also known as Critters 2) is a 1988 American science fiction comedy horror film directed by Mick Garris in his directorial debut, and the second installment in the Critters franchise. A direct sequel to Critters, the film was written by David Twohy and Garris, and stars Scott Grimes, Don Keith Opper and Terrence Mann in their reprising roles. The plot takes place two years after the first film, as a batch of planted Critter eggs begin to hatch and resume their carnivorous appetite upon the town once again.

Although it did not gross as much as the original, the sequel grossed $3.8 million during its theatrical run in the United States. It is the last installment in the series to be released theatrically, and is followed by Critters 3 in 1991.

Plot 
Out in space on a desolate planet, the shape-shifting bounty hunters Ug and Lee and their human companion Charlie McFadden search for a vicious, worm-like creature. After killing the beast, they depart the planet. Soon afterwards, they receive a new assignment by Zanti, head of the High Council. He tells them that Critters are still on Earth and must be destroyed. With that, they set a course for Earth. Noticing Charlie brooding, Ug enquires what is wrong. Charlie states his reluctance to going back after two years and asks, concerned, whether they would leave him there. Ug assures him they have no such intentions.

Back on Earth, Brad Brown, now 15, is visiting his grandmother in Grover's Bend, and word gets around the town fast, implying he became well known after the events of the first film. Shortly after the bounty hunters arrive, the Critters attack a man dressed as an Easter Bunny, killing him. No one is aware that it was the Critters who attacked him, as his death is attributed to a farming accident. Eventually the Critters make themselves known when they begin terrorizing the town, growing in large numbers. Lee is killed and devoured by the Critters, causing Ug to slip into a deep depression and revert to his alien form.

The remaining people of the town devise a plan. With Ug polymorphed into a Critter, they lead the Critters to a burger factory in an attempt to blow them up, but that fails and The Critters re-emerge, joined together into a large ball, and begin heading to the church. Just before they reach it, Charlie flies directly into them with Ug's spaceship, successfully destroying the Critters and seemingly sacrificing himself. Ug subsequently takes on Charlie's facial features in honor of his bravery. The next day, as Brad departs, it is revealed that Charlie survived by using a parachute. He stays on Earth, becoming sheriff of the town. Ug departs in a new spacecraft, still wearing the guise of Charlie.

Cast 
 Scott Grimes as Brad Brown
 Terrence Mann as Ug
 Liane Alexandra Curtis as Megan Morgan
 Don Keith Opper as Charlie McFadden
 Barry Corbin as Sheriff Harv
 Tom Hodges as Wesley
 Sam Anderson as Mr. Morgan
 Lindsay Parker as Cindy
 Herta Ware as Nana
 Lin Shaye as Sal
 Roxanne Kernohan as Lee
 Douglas Rowe as Quigley
 Eddie Deezen as Hungry Heifer manager
William Hanna as Critter's screams and shrieks

Production 

Garris got the chance to direct after having worked for Steven Spielberg on the television series Amazing Stories as a screenwriter. Garris initially turned down the offer to direct, but later accepted, citing that he was a big fan of the first movie and wanted to make the sequel a more scary film than the first. The Chiodo Brothers, who served as special effects artists on the first film, returned to create the titular creatures, creating over 50 puppets for the film.

The film was shot in Valencia, Santa Clarita, a part of the Los Angeles metropolitan area.

Release 
The film was released theatrically in the United States by New Line Cinema in April 1988. It grossed $3.8 million at the box office and was the last film in the series to be released theatrically.

The film was released on VHS and laserdisc by New Line Home Video later the same year. In 2003, New Line Home Entertainment released the film on DVD. The film was re-released in a set containing all four Critters films on DVD by Warner Bros. in 2010.

Scream Factory, a subsidiary of Shout! Factory, released the four films as part of "The Critters Collection" on Blu-ray. The set was released on November 27, 2018.

Reception 
Rotten Tomatoes reports that 31% of 13 surveyed critics gave the film a positive review; the average rating is 4.2/10. Film critic Roger Ebert gave the film 1 out of 4 stars: "It lacks all of the style and sense of fun of the original Critters (1986) and has no reason for existence".

Discussing the film several years after its release, writer David Twohy said in an interview with Starlog that "Critters 2 is something I'm still not terribly pleased is on my résumé".

Sequels 
Critters 2: The Main Course was followed by Critters 3 and Critters 4, directed by Kristine Peterson and Rupert Harvey, respectively.

See also 
 Sweets and Sour Marge

References

External links 

 
 
 
 

1988 horror films
1980s comedy horror films
1980s science fiction films
American science fiction horror films
American space adventure films
American comedy horror films
American sequel films
American monster movies
1988 directorial debut films
Films directed by Mick Garris
Puppet films
Films about shapeshifting
Films with screenplays by David Twohy
Critters (franchise)
Films set in Kansas
Films set on fictional planets
Films shot in California
Holiday horror films
Films with screenplays by Mick Garris
Films scored by Nicholas Pike
1988 comedy films
1988 films
1980s English-language films
1980s American films